The 2022 West Virginia Mountaineers football team represented West Virginia University in the 2022 NCAA Division I FBS football season. The Mountaineers played their home games at Milan Puskar Stadium in Morgantown, West Virginia, and competed in the Big 12 Conference. They were led by fourth-year head coach Neal Brown.

Preseason

Big 12 media poll
The preseason poll was released on July 7, 2022.  

First place votes in 

Preseason Big-12 awards
2022 Preseason All-Big 12 teams 

Source:

Offseason

Recruits

Transfer Portal

Outgoing Transfers

Incoming Transfers

Schedule

Game summaries

at No. 17 Pittsburgh (College GameDay)

Statistics

Kansas

Statistics

Towson

Statistics

at Virginia Tech

Statistics

at Texas

Statistics

Baylor

Statistics

at Texas Tech

Statistics

Coaching staff

References

West Virginia
West Virginia Mountaineers football seasons
West Virginia Mountaineers football